Antonín Máša (22 July 1935 – 4 October 2001) was a Czech film director and screenwriter. His movie Hotel for Strangers competed in Cannes Film Festival.

Life
Máša was born in Višňová on 22 July 1935. He was a childhood friend with Pavel Juráček. They both went to study screenwriting at Film and TV School of the Academy of Performing Arts in Prague.

Filmography

As screenwriter
 A Place in the Group (1964)
 Courage for Every Day (1965)
 Holiday for a Dog (1980)
 What’s the Matter With You, Doctor? (1984)

As director
 Searching (1965)
 Hotel for Strangers (1967)
 Looking Back (1968)
 Rodeo (1972)
 Proč nevěřit na zázraky (1977)
 Silence of the Larks (1989)
 Were We Really Like This? (1990)

References

External links
 

1935 births
2001 deaths
Czech film directors
Czech screenwriters
Male screenwriters
People from Příbram District
20th-century screenwriters